Dapsimni Station is a station on the Seoul Subway Line 5 in Dongdaemun-gu, Seoul.

Station layout

References 

Railway stations opened in 1995
Seoul Metropolitan Subway stations
Metro stations in Dongdaemun District